Sherrie Sprenger is a business owner and Republican politician from the US state of Oregon. A native of Linn County, she served in the Oregon House of Representatives for the 17th District from 2008 to 2021.

Early life
Sprenger was born in the unincorporated community of Lacomb near Lebanon in Linn County. In 2005, she graduated from Leadership Oregon, and in 2007 earned a bachelor's degree from Corban College (now Corban University) in Salem, Oregon. Sprenger previously worked as a sheriff's deputy in Eastern Oregon's Grant County and in Benton County, which neighbors Linn County to the west. She is married to Kyle, and they have one son.

Political career
By 2008 Sprenger had become chairperson of the Lebanon Community Schools' school board. On February 1, 2008, she was appointed to the Oregon House of Representatives to replace Fred Girod who had been appointed to the Oregon Senate. After winning election to a full two-year term in November 2008, she beat Bruce Cuff in the May 2010 primary and then won re-election to the House in November 2010 by defeating Democrat Richard Harisay in the general election, she was re-elected in 2012, 2014, and 2016. During the 2011 legislative session, Sprenger helped support a bill to once again allow people to use dogs when hunting cougars. The bill, which would have reversed part of Oregon Ballot Measure 18, passed in the House of Representatives but failed in a senate committee, therefore not reaching the floor of the senate.

References

External links
 Campaign website
 Legislative website
 2010 General Election Voters Pamphlet, page 21
 2012 Primary Election Voters Pamphlet, page 22

Republican Party members of the Oregon House of Representatives
People from Linn County, Oregon
Living people
Law enforcement in Oregon
School board members in Oregon
Corban University alumni
Women state legislators in Oregon
21st-century American politicians
21st-century American women politicians
Year of birth missing (living people)